Frances Emily White (8 June 1832 – 29 December 1903) was an American anatomist and physiologist.

White was born in Andover, New Hampshire, and educated at the Woman's Medical College of Pennsylvania. She went on to become a demonstrator in Anatomy and Instructor in Physiology from 1872 to 1876. White was then a Professor of Physiology from 1876 until her death in 1903.

White was one of the first women to lecture before the Franklin Institute of Philadelphia, and was the first woman delegate to the International Medical Congress, in 1890. She was also a lifelong advocate for women's education.

She died in Boston of uterine cancer at the age of 71.

References

1832 births
1903 deaths
Woman's Medical College of Pennsylvania alumni
Woman's Medical College of Pennsylvania faculty
American women's rights activists
American women biologists
American anatomists
American physiologists
Women physiologists
Deaths from uterine cancer
Deaths from cancer in Massachusetts
People from Andover, New Hampshire
19th-century American biologists
19th-century American women scientists
20th-century American biologists
20th-century American women scientists
Activists from New Hampshire
Scientists from New Hampshire